Benjamin West (1738–1820) was an Anglo-American painter.

Benjamin or Ben West may also refer to:
Benjamin West (New Hampshire lawyer) (1746–1817), American lawyer
Benjamin West (astronomer) (1730–1813), American astronomer
Ben West (1911–1974), American politician
Ben West Jr. (1941–2019), American politician
Benjamin West Clinedinst (1859–1931),  American painter